The North Shore Sanitary District Tower is located in Highland Park, Illinois. It was built in 1931 to provide ventilation for the local sewer system. The tower features Art Deco elements, including the spire and its stone door trim and windowsills; the application of a formal architectural style is unusual in a purely functional building. It was added to the National Register of Historic Places on June 30, 1983.

The tower is featured on the cover of the album Oceania by The Smashing Pumpkins.

References

Infrastructure completed in 1931
Towers completed in 1931
Highland Park, Illinois
National Register of Historic Places in Lake County, Illinois
Buildings and structures in Lake County, Illinois
Art Deco architecture in Illinois